English Indian Clays Ltd., a company incorporated in India, was part of the erstwhile Thapar Group. The company was incorporated in 1963 in technical and financial collaboration with English China Clays of the UK, the then world leader in kaolin processing. This collaboration with ECC ceased in the year 1992.

EICL has two key divisions, clay and starch.  The Clay Division, having three manufacturing locations in Kerala, specialises in mining and processing of high end kaolins. The Starch Division has two manufacturing units, one located at Yamunanagar, Haryana, manufacturing starch and its derivatives, and the other located at Shimoga exclusively specializing in the manufacture of value added modified starches for various industrial applications.

The Starch division was reportedly sold to Bluecraft Agro Private Limited in January 2019.

The Starch Division was started under the name of Bharat Starch Industries in the year 1937.  It was subsequently taken over by English Indian Clays Ltd. in the year 2002.

References

External links
 Official Web site

Starch companies
Companies based in New Delhi
Chemical companies of India
Chemical companies established in 1963
1963 establishments in Delhi